Ibn Kullab (d. ca. 241/855) was an early Sunni theologian (mutakallim) in Basra and Baghdad in the first half of the 9th century during the time of the Mihna and belonged, according to Ibn al-Nadim, to the traditionalist group of the Nawabit. Often regarded to be the true founder of the Ash'ari madhab. His movement, also called Kullabiyya, merged and developed into Ash'arism, which, along with Maturidism and Atharism (practically: Hanbalism), forms the theological basis of Sunni Islam.

He was known for his criticism of Jahmis,  Mu'tazilis, and Anthropomorphists. He contradicted the Mu'tazili doctrine of Khalq al-Qur'an (Createdness of the Qur'an) by introducing a distinction between the words of God (Kalam Allah) and its realisation.

He was praised by several famous scholars, including Ibn 'Asakir, Taj al-Din al-Subki, Ibn Hajar al-'Asqalani, Ibn Khaldun, Ibn Abi Zayd al-Qayrawani, Ibn Qadi Shuhba, Jamal al-Din al-Isnawi, Kamal al-Din al-Bayadi in his Isharat al-Maram, Abu Mansur al-Baghdadi in his work Kitab Usul al-Din, al-Shahrastani in al-Milal wa al-Nihal, and al-Kawthari.

Name 
Abu Muhammad 'Abdallah ibn Sa'id ibn Kullab al-Qattan al-Basri al-Tamimi.

Life 
He belonged to the generation of Ahmad ibn Hanbal and Ishaq ibn Rahwayh. His precise year of birth is unknown, but he lived in the period of the 'Abbasid caliph al-Ma'mun.

Students 
It has been said that Dawud al-Zahiri and al-Harith al-Muhasibi learned kalam from him, according to al-Dhahabi in his Siyar A'lam Al-Nubala'. It has been reported also that al-Junayd al-Baghdadi was one of his students.

Books 
He has a number of works that are documented such as:
 Kitab al-Radd 'ala al-Hashwiyya (meaning the 'crammers,' a term also used for the deviant misguided Anthropomorphists).
 Kitab al-Radd 'ala al-Mu'tazila.
 Kitab al-Sifat (Book of Divine Attributes).
 Kitab in al-Tawhid (Book of Islamic Monotheism).
 Kitab Khalq al-Af'al (Book of the Creation of Human Acts).

These books are lost, however remnants of them can be found in other works such as Maqalat al-Islamiyyin of Abu al-Hasan al-Ash'ari. He was also quoted by the early Ash'ari scholars such as Ibn Furak (d. 406H).

Death 
He died in 240 AH, or according to some in 241 AH.

See also 
 Ahmad ibn Hanbal
 Muhammad ibn Jarir al-Tabari

Notes

References 

Shafi'is
Salaf
Kullabis
9th-century Muslim theologians
Sunni imams
Sunni Muslim scholars of Islam
Converts to Islam
People from Basra
854 deaths
855 deaths
9th-century Arabs